John of Carleton was the Dean of Wells between 1351 and 1360.

References

Deans of Wells